"Whenever You're Around" is a song by American R&B singer/actress Jill Scott. The song was released in 2008 in support of her album, The Real Thing: Words and Sounds Vol. 3.

Charts

References
http://www.jillscott.com/live/2008/whenever-youre-around-on-leno-last-night-she-kills-it.html

2008 singles
Jill Scott (singer) songs
2007 songs
Songs written by Jill Scott (singer)
Hidden Beach Recordings singles
Funk songs